Yoshikazu is a masculine Japanese given name.

Possible writings
Yoshikazu can be written using different combinations of kanji characters. Here are some examples: 

義一, "justice, 1"
義和, "justice, harmony"
吉一, "good luck, 1"
吉和, "good luck, harmony"
善一, "virtuous, 1"
善和, "virtuous, harmony"
芳一, "virtuous/fragrant, 1"
芳和, "virtuous/fragrant, harmony"
良一, "good, 1"
良和, "good, harmony"
喜和, "rejoice, harmony"
慶和, "congratulate, harmony"
能一, "capacity, 1"
嘉一, "excellent, 1"

The name can also be written in hiragana よしかず or katakana ヨシカズ.

Notable people with the name
, Japanese shōgun
, Japanese cyclist
, Japanese rugby union player
, Japanese conductor
, Japanese footballer and manager
, Japanese warrior
, Japanese footballer
Yoshikazu Iwamoto (岩本 由和, born 1945), Japanese musician
, Japanese film director and screenwriter
, Japanese farmer, writer and educator
, Japanese actor and singer
, Japanese singer
, Japanese photographer
, Japanese shogi player
, Japanese footballer and manager
, Japanese footballer
, Japanese religious leader
Yoshikazu Sakai (酒井 喜和), Japanese Paralympic swimmer
, Japanese photographer
, Japanese musician
, Japanese footballer
, Japanese writer
, Japanese businessman
, Japanese professional wrestler
, Japanese architect and structural engineer
, Japanese sumo wrestler
, Japanese guitarist
Yoshikazu Yokoshima (横島 由一, born 1952), Japanese golfer
, Japanese animator and manga artist

See also
8102 Yoshikazu, a main-belt asteroid

Japanese masculine given names